Gerdu-ye Olya (also Romanized as Gerdū-ye ‘Olyā and Gerdū ‘Olyā; also known as Gerdū Bālā and Gerdū Qal’eh) is a village in Dasht-e Zarrin Rural District, in the Central District of Kuhrang County, Chaharmahal and Bakhtiari Province, Iran. At the 2006 census, its population was 230, in 40 families. The village is populated by Lurs.

References 

Populated places in Kuhrang County
Luri settlements in Chaharmahal and Bakhtiari Province